Derris parviflora is a species of leguminous plants. it is found in Sri Lanka.

References

External links

 
 Derris parviflora at The Plant List
 Derris parviflora at Tropicos
 Derris parviflora at the Ayurvedic plants database

Millettieae
Plants described in 1860
Flora of Sri Lanka